Dinescu is a Romanian surname. Notable people with the surname include:

Mircea Dinescu (born 1950), Romanian poet, journalist, and editor
Violeta Dinescu (born 1953), Romanian classical composer, pianist, and academic

Romanian-language surnames